Colors Rishtey is an Indian pay general entertainment television channel that mainly broadcasts re-runs of programming from Colors TV and also airs shows from NDTV Imagine & DD National. International Feeds Of ‘Colors Rishtey’ Also Air Dubbed Shows And Regional Shows.

Programs of Pakistani channels have been aired, such as Humsafar. Rishtey rebroadcasts series from many other channels as well.

The channel started original production of its shows as well. Produced by BBC Media Action, Navrangi Re! is the channel's first original programming.

On 1 March 2019, the channel was rebranded as Colors Rishtey.

Nick Hour
In 2016, Viacom18 launched a Nick programming block named "Nick Hour India" on Colors Rishtey India.

Programming

References

External links

Official Website of Rishtey

Hindi-language television stations
Hindi-language television channels in India
Television channels and stations established in 2012
Television stations in Mumbai
Viacom 18
2014 establishments in Maharashtra